Journal of Physics G: Nuclear and Particle Physics is a peer-reviewed journal that publishes theoretical and experimental research into nuclear physics, particle physics and particle astrophysics, including all interface areas between these fields.

The editor-in-chief is Jacek Dobaczewski, University of York, UK.

Scope
The journal publishes research articles on:
 theoretical and experimental topics in the physics of elementary particles and fields;
 intermediate-energy physics and nuclear physics;
 experimental and theoretical research in particle, neutrino, and nuclear astrophysics;
 research arising from all interface areas among these fields.

Research is published in the following formats:
 Research Papers: Reports of original and high-quality research work;
 Research Notes: Contributions from individuals (or small groups) within large collaborations, containing early results of analyses, detector development, simulations, etc. which might not otherwise be published in the wider literature;
 Topical Reviews: Specially commissioned review articles on areas of current interest;
 LabTalk: Article summaries written by the researchers themselves which introduce the findings, techniques, and possible applications of their research.

Abstracting and indexing information
The journal is indexed in INSPEC Information Services, ISI (Science Citation Index, SciSearch, ISI Alerting Services, Current Contents/Physical, Chemical and Earth Sciences), Article@INIST, and Chemical Abstracts.

External links
 Journal of Physics G: Nuclear and Particle Physics website
 IOP Publishing

References

IOP Publishing academic journals
Nuclear physics journals
Particle physics journals
Physics journals